The 1972–73 Virginia Squires season was the third season of the Virginia Squires in the American Basketball Association. The Squires had one of their victories due to forfeit, on October 26, when the Denver Rockets forfeited to them. The Squires had a 21–21 first half with, a five-game winning streak in that half. In the second half, they finished the same, though they did lose five straight games near the end of the season. They finished 4th in points scored at 114.1 per game and 8th in points allowed at 114.4 per game. This was the debut season of future Hall of Famer George Gervin. In the Division Semifinals, the Squires lost in five games.

Roster
 34 Mike Barr - Shooting guard
 25 Jim Eakins - Center
 32 Julius Erving - Small forward
 23 William Franklin - Power forward
 44 George Gervin - Shooting guard 
 30 George Irvine - Small forward 
 24 Neil Johnson - Power forward
 12 Jim Ligon - Power forward
 51 Erwin Mueller - Power forward 
 3 Al Sanders - Power forward 
 21 Billy Shepherd - Point guard
 35 Willie Sojourner - Center 
 14 Roland Taylor - Point guard
 13 Dave Twardzik - Point guard 
 11 Bernie Williams - Shooting guard

Final standings

Eastern Division

Playoffs
Eastern Division Semifinals

Squire lose series, 4–1

Awards and honors
1973 ABA All-Star Game selections (game played on February 6, 1973) 
Julius Erving

References

 Squires on Basketball Reference

External links
 RememberTheABA.com 1972-73 regular season and playoff results
 Virginia Squires page

Virginia Squires
Virginia Squires
Virginia Squires, 1972-73
Virginia Squires, 1972-73